The rivière du Milieu (English: River of the Middle) flows in the unorganized territory Baie-de-la-Bouteille, in the Matawinie Regional County Municipality, in the administrative region of Lanaudière, in the province of Quebec, in Canada.

The course of the river is entirely in a forest environment. From the end of the XIXth, the economy of the sector was centered on forestry. At XXth, recreational and tourist activities have been highlighted.

Geography 

This lake is surrounded to the west by a mountain with a summit reached , that of the northeast reached  and that of the west . The watershed on the northeast side of this lake is the Alexandrine River. Lake Hastel drains mountain lakes all around, including lakes: "de la Pipe", "au Sable" and Laroche.

Course downstream from Lake Hastel

From the mouth of Lake Hastel (south-eastern point), the Milieu river descends on:
  southward to empty into the northeastern part of Corner Lake;
  west, then southwest, crossing Lake Corner. This lake receives on the east side the discharge of the lakes (altitude): du Camp, Garceau and Azellus; and on the west side the discharge of the lakes (altitudes): des Faucons, Pies and Coucoune;
  towards the south, crossing 4 small lakes including Lac de la Forêt which is a marshy lake;
  to the southwest, crossing Lac du Bocage, which receives a stream from the north draining lakes Rovolver, du Père and Swallows;
  towards the south-west, forming several coils, until the discharge coming from the south, which drains the lakes of Piment and of Buisson;
  towards the southwest, forming several coils, until the discharge coming from the north of the horseshoe lake and the lake of the Pitoune;
  southwesterly to the outlet coming from the south of Lac du Button coming from the east;
  towards the south, up to the outlet of lac de la Hutte coming from the east;
  towards the south, in several serpentines to Lac Chantier;
  southward crossing Chantier lake over its full length.

Course downstream from Lac Chantier

From the mouth of Chantier Lake, the river descends:
  to the south-east;
  crossing Lake des Fourches from north to south;
  towards the south-east to a small lake of Merle that the river crosses;
  southeasterly to the outlet of Bug Lake (altitude ), coming from the northeast;
  towards the south-east up to the Saint-Cyr stream, coming from the north-east;
  southeasterly, to Spring Creek, coming from the north;
  towards the south-east, up to the Boullé stream, coming from the east;
  towards the south, up to the Guide brook, coming from the east;
  south-east, to Charland lake;
  towards the south-east, crossing Lake Charland, which has many peninsulas on each shore.

Course downstream from Lake Charland

From the mouth of Charland Lake, the river flows down to:
  south-east to a bridge of the forest road spanning the river;
  towards the southeast to the mouth of the outlet of Lake Arsène, coming from the east;
  eastward, crossing the "Rapides Perrault", to the stream coming from the north and draining a series of lakes;
  towards the southeast, up to the Perrault brook;
  south-east, then north-east, to the Coteaux stream, coming from the south;
  towards the south-east, crossing the "Rapides du Brochet", to the Laviolette river, coming from the north and draining Laviolette lake. The Laviolette river is the main tributary of the Milieu river;
  to the south-east, then to the north, to the outlet of Lac de la Potasse, coming from the north;
  towards the south-east, up to the outlet of Lake Dominica, coming from the north;
  south-east, to the Middle Bay of Taureau Reservoir.

The Rivière du Milieu descends southward entirely into the unorganized territory of Baie-de-la-Bouteille, crossing the Blueberry, Perrault and Brochet rapids. From the mouth by going up the river, the Manouane road runs along the river on the west side; then north of lac des fourches, this path continues on the east side of the river.

Toponymy 
The toponym Rivière du Milieu is likened to the Baie du Milieu where the river flows. The toponym Rivière du Milieu was registered on December 5, 1968, in the Place Names Bank of the Commission de toponymie du Québec.

See also 

 List of rivers of Quebec

References 

Rivers of Lanaudière